The tenth season of the Syfy reality television series Face Off premiered on January 13, 2016. This season marked the return of the judges' power to save an artist from elimination.  The grand prize for the fifth season is a VIP trip from Kryolan to one of their 85 locations, a 2016 Fiat 500, and $100,000. Rob Seal of Lake View Terrace, California was declared the winner of this season on April 13, 2016.

Contestants

Recurring people
 McKenzie Westmore - Host
 Michael Westmore - Mentor

Judges
 Ve Neill
 Glenn Hetrick
 Neville Page

Contestant progress

 The contestant won Face Off.
  The contestant was a runner-up.
 The contestant won a Spotlight or Focus Challenge or The Gauntlet.
 The contestant was part of a team that won a Spotlight or Focus Challenge.
 The contestant was in the top in the Spotlight or Focus Challenge.
 The contestant was declared one of the best in the Spotlight or Focus Challenge but was not in the running for the win.
 The contestant was in the bottom in the Spotlight or Focus Challenge or in The Gauntlet.
 The contestant was a teammate of the eliminated contestant in the Spotlight Challenge.
 The contestant was deemed the least successful but was saved by the judges and was not eliminated.
 The contestant was eliminated.
‡ The contestant won a Foundation Challenge or a stage of The Gauntlet.

Episodes

References

External links
 http://www.syfy.com/faceoff

Face Off (TV series)
2016 American television seasons